Ralph Matema (born June 19, 1982) is a Zimbabwean footballer. He has been a member of the Zimbabwe national football team.

"Raru", as he is popularly known, is the reigning top scorer of the Zimbabwean CBZ Premier League after netting 19 times in the 2006 season. In 2007, he scored 10 goals in 11 games but left Highlanders FC to join Orlando Pirates for the 2007/2008 season.

References 

1982 births
Living people
Sportspeople from Bulawayo
Zimbabwean footballers
Zimbabwe international footballers
Zimbabwean expatriate footballers
Expatriate soccer players in South Africa
Zimbabwean expatriate sportspeople in South Africa
Association football forwards
Orlando Pirates F.C. players
Highlanders F.C. players
Witbank Spurs F.C. players
Yadah Stars F.C. players
South African Premier Division players
National First Division players